The Plainfield Civic District is a  historic district located in the city of Plainfield in Union County, New Jersey. It was added to the National Register of Historic Places on June 17, 1993 for its significance in architecture, politics/government, and community planning. The district includes three contributing buildings and one contributing object.

History and description
The three contributing buildings in the district face Watchung Avenue. Built 1915–1919, the Plainfield City Hall was designed by architects Peck and Bottomley and features Georgian Revival architecture. Built 1922–1923, the YMCA Building is a three-story brick building featuring a limestone vestibule with Corinthian columns. Built in 1928, the former Seventh-Day Baptist Building, now the City Hall Annex, features Jacobethan Revival architecture. Built in 1927, the Plainfield War Memorial, a contributing object, features a flagpole on a tier of pink granite circular steps. East of the memorial is the Crescent Avenue Presbyterian Church, which contributes to the Crescent Area Historic District.

See also
National Register of Historic Places listings in Union County, New Jersey

References

External links
 

Plainfield, New Jersey	
National Register of Historic Places in Union County, New Jersey
Historic districts on the National Register of Historic Places in New Jersey
Historic districts in Union County, New Jersey
New Jersey Register of Historic Places